Adua may refer to:
Adwa, a town in northern Ethiopia
Italian submarine Adua
El Idwa, a city in the Minya Governorate, Egypt